The Kildare Intermediate Football Championship, or Kildare I.F.C., is an annual Gaelic football competition contested by mid-tier Kildare GAA clubs since 1928. The winners currently receive the Hugh Campion Cup in honour of the Suncroft official who served as County Board Chairman from 1972 to 1981.

Qualification for subsequent competitions

Leinster Intermediate Club Football Championship
The Kildare IFC winner qualifies for the Leinster Intermediate Club Football Championship. It is the only team from County Kildare to qualify for this competition. The Kildare IFC winner may enter the Leinster Intermediate Club Football Championship at either the preliminary round or the quarter-final stage. For example, 2018 winner Two Mile House won the Leinster final, as did 2016 winner St Colmcille's, also at GAA headquarters. as did 2012 winner Monasterevin, 2006 winner Confey, while the Kildare IFC winning club won consecutive Leinster IHC titles in 2009 and 2010, won respectively by Maynooth and Ballymore Eustace...

All-Ireland Intermediate Club Football Championship
The Kildare IFC winner — by winning the Leinster Intermediate Club Football Championship — may qualify for the All-Ireland Intermediate Club Football Championship, at which it would enter at the semi-final stage, providing it hasn't been drawn to face the British champions in the quarter-finals.

Awards

Trophy
The captain of the winning team is presented with the Hugh Campion Cup in honour of the Suncroft official who served as County Board Chairman from 1972 to 1981.

Team of the Week
A Team of the Week is selected during the competition's run.

Finals listed by years

References

External links
 Kildare GAA 
 Hogan Stand

Gaelic football competitions in County Kildare
Intermediate Gaelic football county championships